Stankovany is a village and municipality in Ružomberok District in the Žilina Region of northern Slovakia.

History
In historical records the village was first mentioned in 1322.

Geography
It has a population of about 770 people.

References

External links
http://www.statistics.sk/mosmis/eng/run.html

Villages and municipalities in Ružomberok District